Simosthenurus occidentalis is a species of sthenurine marsupial that existed in Australia during the Pliocene, becoming extinct in the Pleistocene epoch around 42 000 years ago. A large herbivorous biped that resembles large kangaroos, the species had a heavier body than the modern roo. The structure of the skull and teeth indicates it consumed tough vegetation, resembling koalas and panda bears, and is referred to as a short-faced kangaroo.

Taxonomy
The type specimen was collected by E. A. Le Souef and noted in a report to the state's Caves Board, then revised and published by Ludwig Glauert as Sthenurus occidentalis in 1910. This holotype is fossil material preserving the left and right dentary of an adult found at Mammoth Cave in Southwest Australia.
The specific epithet occidentalis, meaning "of the west", refers to the discovery of this species in Western Australia.

Description

A mid-sized species of Simosthenurus, known as 'short-faced' kangaroos, one of several genera in a macropodid lineage that diversified in Pliocene Australia. The mass of adults is estimated to have around 118 kilograms, standing at a similar height to larger modern roos but with a heavier and more robust body. The dentition contains molars set close to the jaw, which combined with the cranial structure, strongly indicates an animal capable of consuming tough vegetation. The short jaw and facial anatomy clearly distinguishes their appearance from the surviving lineage of kangaroos, which usually graze on grasses rather than a browsing diet, and more closely resembles the habits of the modern koala Phascolarctos cinereus.

A set of powerful molars located close to the hinge of jaw, similar to but further back than a koala, improved the mechanical advantage and a potential enlargement of the zygomaticomandibularis muscles would have reduced the hazard of dislocation while biting with the rear molars.
Modelling of the bite force and the skulls resistance to torsional forces suggests that the species was able to consume tough material, such as leaves, bark and branches, that could be torn with the claws of the long forelimbs. 
The diamond-like shape of the forehead and reinforced cheek bones was able to distribute the forces applied by large muscles to the rear molars at one side of the jaw, strongly suggesting that browsing habit included an ability to tear and chew hardy and fibrous material.
The morphology of the skull and dentition was found to be most comparable to Asian mammal Ailuropoda melanoleuca (panda), an animal that primarily feeds as a browser of tough plant material.

Distribution and habitat 
The species is represented in the records of many southern fossil sites in Australia, including Tasmania. The type locality is located in Southwest Australia, at Mammoth Cave, and evidence from another site in the southwest indicates it existed until about 42 000 years ago. Fossils assigned to the species have been obtained at sites in the Southwest, southern regions of Central Australia and the southeast of the continent. In Tasmania S. occidentalis has been identified at fossil sites in the northeast and central regions, the species has also been found at the nearby King Island.

Their distribution in the Pleistocene is dated to late-middle to late deposits.

References

Species described in 1910
Macropods
Marsupials of Australia
Taxa named by Ludwig Glauert